Taco John's International, Inc. is an American fast food restaurant founded in 1969 by John Turner. The chain serves Mexican-inspired fast food (which it calls "West-Mex") as well as the company's signature dish, Potato Olés, which are bite-sized deep-fried potato nuggets coated with a proprietary blend of spices and seasonings. Taco John's CEO is James Woodson, and it is headquartered in Cheyenne, Wyoming. As of 2022, the restaurant chain had 380 restaurants in about 22 states, primarily in the Midwest and Mountain regions.

History

Early days 
Taco John's started in 1968 as a trailer called Taco House, run by John Turner.

Turner was an officer in the United States Air Force who served during the Korean War and an aspiring entrepreneur; he was stationed at FE Warren AFB, where he began digging into his entrepreneurial spirit. Initially, Turner wanted to find a physical location for a taco stand. He went to James Woodson to find a location to lease, and Woodson redirected him to Harold W. Holmes, who converted one of his campers into a 12x30 trailer in seven days. This was just in time to pop up at Cheyenne Frontier Days that year, and it was an instant hit. By the end of the year, the first official taco stand opened on the corner of Carey Ave and W 24th St (not to be confused with the first brick-and-mortar location a block away), continuing under the Taco House brand.

Name change, franchising, and explosive growth 
Turner began the shift to a franchise in 1969 by selling the franchise rights to Woodson and Holmes, who changed the name to Taco John's in honor of Turner and opened a franchise store under the Taco John's banner. They also launched Woodson-Holmes Enterprises, which gave Woodson the restaurant franchise rights, and the company name became Taco John's International, Inc. The new franchise location featured Taco John's original mascot, a devil, and displayed the tagline "the hottest spot in town". More locations opened in 1969, including the Loveland, Colorado, location on Lincoln Avenue.

This led to more growth of the brand in the 1970s, with many new locations opening, including the 100th store in Scottsbluff, Nebraska, in 1975. In 1973, the first physical brick-and-mortar, in-the-ground Taco John's was built at Carey Ave and W 23rd St in Cheyenne, Wyoming, including a drive-thru. The original Taco John's building was moved to S Greeley Hwy and I-80, where it was demolished, but there is still a Taco John's at that location today.

Taco John's saw such massive growth that it upgraded its Cheyenne headquarters in 1985. The nineties also saw record-breaking success, with an Iowa-based franchise being the first to gain over $1 million in sales in 1994.

Brand partnerships with some challenges 
By 2004, Taco John's began a new form of expansion normally seen in larger brands, involving partnerships with other restaurants, including local brands like Good Times Burgers & Frozen Custard and Steak Escape in 2004 and an Arby's in Lindenhurst, New York, that opened in 2015.

While some of these combo stores still exist, including the Taco John's/Steak Escape Combo at Logan St and E 58th Ave in Denver, many have either embarked on a solo journey as the Cheyenne Taco John's did after Good Times disappeared around 2010, or even completely shuttered, as in Commerce City.

Around the same time that some of these combo restaurants were closing, the original franchise owners were reaching their final days. Woodson died at age 87 in 2008 in Scottsdale, Arizona. Holmes died in 2012 of heart complications at age 92 in a hospital in Phoenix, Arizona.

Subsequent booms and challenges 
Although Taco John's targeted smaller Midwestern and Western communities in its early years, the chain also began expanding its presence in larger metropolitan areas like Denver and Kansas City, where it had a minor presence since the 1980s. Taco John's also operates several outlets serving the U.S. Armed Forces through the Army and Air Force Exchange Service (AAFES).

While some Taco John's have closed, others have opened, and new experiments have arisen. For example, in 2016, Taco John's saw its first Love's Travel Stop location open in Liberal, Kansas. This was not the first instance of a Travel Stop combo, with one of the more recent Taco John's opening in the Loves Travel Center of Berthoud in 2018.

In April 2016, the company announced a deal to open 40 new stores in New York and Tennessee. The deal includes 20 stores in the New York City area and the Northeast with an option for 15 more. As of October 2016, the company had 390 restaurants spread throughout Wyoming and 24 other states. As of August 2021, there is only one New York location, in JFK airport.

In 2017, Taco John's opened 10 new locations and expanded to Tennessee and Indiana. In 2019, it planned to open new locations in central Kentucky, Georgia, South Carolina and North Carolina.

As of August 2021, there are 380 locations, with more planned.

In 2022, Taco John's filed suit against a small Minnesota restaurant chain, Taco Chon, which it accused of stealing its image and likeness.

Building prototypes 

Taco John's has had many different styles over the years. Their most recent one is best reflected by the Cheyenne restaurant, the first location to use this specific style, rebuilt in 2019.

Trademarks
Taco John's has adopted and trademarked the term "West-Mex" to describe their food and service attitude. The company defines "West-Mex" food as having fresh, bold flavors, including their signature "Potato Olés", sauces, spices, and salsas.

In 1989, the company trademarked the phrase "Taco Tuesday" in every state but New Jersey, where another restaurant already had trademarked the phrase.

Advertising, mascots, slogans, and logos

Mascots 
Taco John's early mascot, depicted on their street signage above the words "The Hottest Spot In Town," was a devil character. Later mascots were versions of a cartoonish Mexican character named Juan with a giant sombrero and a donkey named Pépé. That figure was replaced in the mid-1990s by a more modern, artistic image.

Taco John's recent advertising icons have included Whiplash the Cowboy Monkey, a popular rodeo attraction and PRCA Entertainer of the Year, who rides on his dog Ben to the rescue of hungry taco lovers.

Punk band In Defence performed their song "Call More Dudes" in a Taco John's as part of a tribute to the franchise.

In the 1990s, Taco John's slogan was "A Whole Lotta Mexican," which accompanied a jingle that stated "Once we getcha, then we gotcha.... gotcha coming back for more! Taco John's."

2006 E. coli outbreak
In December 2006, a reported 50 people became sick and 18 people were hospitalized after eating at a Taco John's restaurant in Iowa. Shortly after that, Minnesota health officials reported that an additional 27 people became ill after eating at Taco John's restaurants in Rio Grande City, Texas and Grand Forks, North Dakota. On December 14, Black Hawk County, Iowa health officials stated that lettuce tainted with E. coli had been discovered in the supply chain. That same day, a Cedar Falls couple filed a lawsuit against Taco John's after their 9-year-old daughter was hospitalized for symptoms of E. coli. Taco John's dropped its produce supplier, Bix Produce of Grand Forks, North Dakota, as a result of the outbreaks. After a thorough investigation by the Minnesota Department of Health and the FDA, Bix Produce was cleared of any wrongdoing in the matter. The source of the outbreak was traced back to the growing fields in California. This incident came about at the same time as an unrelated E. coli outbreak at Taco Bell restaurants in the midwestern United States.

Gallery

See also
 List of Mexican restaurants

References

External links
 
Taco John's International, Inc., Records at the University of Wyoming - American Heritage Center

Companies based in Cheyenne, Wyoming
Food and drink companies based in Wyoming
Restaurants in Wyoming
Economy of the Midwestern United States
Regional restaurant chains in the United States
Fast-food chains of the United States
Restaurants established in 1969
Fast-food Mexican restaurants
Mexican restaurants in the United States
1969 establishments in Wyoming
Wyoming culture